Johann Sebastian Bach composed the church cantata  (You Prince of Peace, Lord Jesus Christ), 116, in Leipzig for the 25th Sunday after Trinity. He led the first performance on 26 November 1724, concluding the liturgical year of 1724.

The cantata is based upon Jakob Ebert's hymn "". It matches the Sunday's prescribed gospel reading, the Tribulation from the Gospel of Matthew, in a general way. The hymn's first and last stanzas are retained unchanged in both text and tune: the former is set as a chorale fantasia, the latter as a four-part closing chorale. An unknown librettist paraphrased the inner stanzas as alternating arias and recitatives. Bach scored the cantata for four vocal soloists (soprano, alto, tenor, bass), a four-part choir and a Baroque instrumental ensemble of natural horn enforcing the soprano in the hymn tune, two oboes d'amore, strings, and basso continuo.

History and text 
Bach wrote the cantata in 1724 for the 25th Sunday after Trinity as part of his second annual cycle of mostly chorale cantatas. The prescribed readings for the Sunday were from the First Epistle to the Thessalonians, the coming of the Lord, and from the Gospel of Matthew, the Tribulation. The cantata text of an unknown author is based exclusively on Jakob Ebert's hymn in seven stanzas (1601). The librettist of Bach's chorale cantata cycle is not known,but Bach scholar Christoph Wolff notes that "he must have worked closely with Bach" and names as "the most likely candidate" Andreas Stöbel, a co-rector of the Thomasschule. The first and last stanza in their original wording are the outer movements, stanzas 2 to 4 were transformed to movements 2 to 4, and stanzas 5 and 6 were rephrased for movement 5. The hymn is in a general way related to the gospel.

Bach led the first performance of the cantata on 26 November 1724, which was that year the last Sunday of the liturgical year. The parts show that Bach performed it at least once more but not until after 1740.

Music

Structure and scoring 
Bach structured the cantata in six movements. The text and tune of the hymn are kept in the outer choral movements, a chorale fantasia and a four-part closing chorale, which frame a sequence of alternating arias and recitatives. Bach scored the work for four vocal soloists (soprano, alto, tenor, bass), a four-part choir and a Baroque instrumental ensemble of natural horn (Co) enforcing the soprano in the hymn tune, two oboes d'amore (Oa), two violins (Vl), viola (Va) and basso continuo. The title page of the autograph score reads: "Dom: 25 post Trinit. / Du Friede Fürst Herr Jesu / Christ ect. / à / 4 Voc: / Tromba / 2 Hautb: d'Amour / 2 Violini / viola / con / Continuo / di / Sign: / J.S.Bach".

In the following table of the movements, the scoring follows the Neue Bach-Ausgabe. The keys and time signatures are taken from Alfred Dürr, using the symbol for common time (4/4). The continuo, playing throughout, is not shown.

Movements

1 
The opening chorus, "" (You Prince of Peace, Lord Jesus Christ), is a chorale fantasia, the soprano singing the cantus firmus, supported by the horn. The composer of the tune is not known. It appeared in a hymnal by Bartholomäus Gesius in 1601, and is similar to "Innsbruck, ich muß dich lassen".

The melody is embedded in an orchestral concerto with ritornellos and interludes, dominated by the concertante solo violin. The treatment of the lower voices is varied within the movement. In lines 1 and 2 and the final 7 they are set in homophonic block chords. The Bach scholar Klaus Hofmann notes that the salutation "Du Friedefürst, Herr Jesu Christ, wahr' Mensch und wahrer Gott" (You prince of peace, Lord Jesus Christ, true man and true God) thus receives weight. In lines 3 and 4 the lower voices begin in vivid imitation before the entrance of the cantus firmus. In lines 5 and 6 their faster movement contrasts to the melody.

2 
The alto aria, "" (Alas, the agony is unspeakable), is accompanied by an oboe d'amore as an equal partner, expressing the soul's terror imagining the judgement. Hofmann notes that "Bach has captured the expression of deep sadness in the music with all the tools of his trade: sighing figures, suspensions and augmented, diminished or chromatic melodic intervals: the harmony is full of dissonances."

3 
The recitative for tenor, "" (Yet consider, o Jesus), begins as a secco recitative, but the idea "" (Yet consider, o Jesus, that you are still called a Prince of Peace!), close to the theme of the cantata, is accompanied by a quote of the chorale tune in the continuo.

4 
Rare in Bach's cantatas, three voices sing a trio. In the text "" (Ah, we recognize our guilt)", they illustrate the "" (we), confessing and asking forgiveness together. The voices are accompanied only by the continuo.

5 
The recitative for alto, "" (Ah, then through the harsh rod), is a prayer for lasting peace, accompanied by the strings and ending as an arioso.

6 
The closing chorale, "" (Illumine our minds and hearts as well), is a four-part setting for the choir, horn, oboes and strings.

Recordings 
The listing is taken from the selection on the Bach-Cantatas website. Ensembles playing period instruments in historically informed performances are marked by green background.

References

Sources 

 
 Du Friedefürst, Herr Jesu Christ BWV 116; BC A 164 / Chorale cantata (25th Sunday after Trinity) Leipzig University
 Du Friedefürst, Herr Jesu Christ, BWV 116 English translation, University of Vermont
 Luke Dahn: BWV 116.6 bach-chorales.com

Church cantatas by Johann Sebastian Bach
1724 compositions
Chorale cantatas